Dongping County is a county in the southwestern part of Tai'an, in the west of Shandong Province, China.

In 2007 a remarkable series of well-preserved frescoes dating to the Western Han Period (206 BC - 25 AD) was discovered in a tomb as construction workers were excavating for a planned shopping mall. The frescoes show, among other things, one of the earliest pictorial representations of Confucius meeting Laozi.

Examples of the frescoes

History

This region is home to many Buddhist temples and some remarkable Buddhist inscriptions, originally texts were carved during the Northern Qi, but in the eleventh century these were carved over with pictorial images of Buddhas.

In 1438, migrating Hui people introduced Islam to Dongping County.

During the Cultural Revolution in Dongping County, religious activities were prohibited. Mosques were destroyed, imams were expelled, and the Quran was burned. The practice of Islam in the county was resumed in 1979.

The Shandong provincial government and the Dongping County government allocated special funding to restore Zhoucheng Mosque in 1997, and again in 2001.

Administration

As 2020, this county is divided to 3 subdistricts, 9 towns and 2 townships.
Subdistricts


Pengji Subdistrict
Towns

Townships
Shanglaozhuang Township
Jiuxian Township

Demographics 
In 2016, Dongping County had a permanent population of about 762,100 people, of which, 41.35% lived in urban areas.

Vital statistics 
As of 2016, Dongping County had a birth rate of 14.9 per thousand, and a death rate of 5.0 per thousand, giving the county a rate of natural increase of 9.9 per thousand.

Ethnic groups 
Most of the county's population is ethnically Han Chinese, however, Dongping County is home to 18 ethnic minorities, comprising about 4,300 people. The largest ethnic minority is the Hui people, who number about 4,100 as of 2016. Other ethnic minorities in the county include the Mongolian, Tibetan, Miao, Dong, Bai, Tujia, Hani, Dai, Lisu, Li, Jingpo, Yi, Zhuang, Buyi, Korean, Manchu, and Wa peoples. With the exception of the Hui people, many of Dongping County's ethnic minorities recently moved to the county for work, marriage, or other regions, and are not concentrated in any particular place within the county.

Hui people 
Unlike the other minorities in Dongping County, the Hui people are concentrated within certain areas within the county. Large concentrations of Hui people can be found in Laohu, Zhoucheng Subdistrict, and Dongping Subdistrict. Smaller concentrations can be found within , Xinhu, and Shanglaozhuang Township.

Culture

Language 
The Dongping dialect, a dialect of Mandarin Chinese, is spoken widely throughout the county. Some areas in the southeast and north of the county also employ erhua.

Religion 

As of 2021, Dongping County is home to 19 religious venues approved by the county government, representing 5 different faith groups: Catholicism, Protestantism, Islam, Daoism, and Buddhism.

Climate

Notable people 

 Zhongli Chun, Qi consort from 
 , Red Eyebrows commander
 , Han dynasty scholar and writer
 , Northern Qi monk and calligrapher
 Cheng Yaojin, Tang dynasty general
 He Ning, Five Dynasties and Ten Kingdoms period official
 Liang Kai, Song dynasty painter
 , Song dynasty pediatrician
 Wang Zhen, Yuan dynasty inventor, engineer, writer, and politician
 , Yuan dynasty dramatist
 Luo Guanzhong (disputed), Yuan dynasty writer
 , Ming dynasty politician
 , Ming dynasty scholar

References

 Ha, Jungmin. (2016) Shaping Religious and Cultural Aspiration: Engraved Sutras in Southwestern Shandong Province from the Northern Qi Dynasty (550-577 CE), China. Phd Dissertation. Department of Art, Art History & Visual Studies, Duke University. https://dukespace.lib.duke.edu/dspace/bitstream/handle/10161/12216/Ha_duke_0066D_13425.pdf  
 Wang, Yongbo and Ledderose, Lothar. (2014) Buddhist Stone Sutras in China. (Vol.1) Shandong Sheng  = Shandong Province. edited by Wang Yongbo and Lothar Ledderose.Wiesbaden : Harrassowitz ; Hangzhou : China Academy of Art Press, 2014.

 
Counties of Shandong
Tai'an